DreamWorks Water Park is an indoor water park within the American Dream shopping and entertainment complex, at the Meadowlands Sports Complex in East Rutherford, New Jersey, United States. The park opened on October 1, 2020.

History 

The American Dream shopping mall was first proposed as Meadowlands Mills in 1994. The mall, later renamed Meadowlands Xanadu, was nearly complete in 2009 when construction stopped due to a lack of funding. In 2011, the New Jersey Sports and Exposition Authority formalized an agreement with Triple Five Group, which assumed ownership of the mall and renamed it "American Dream". The revised mall plans included an amusement park and a water park. DreamWorks Animation CEO Jeffrey Katzenberg announced in July 2012 that some of the amusement attractions would be themed upon DreamWorks productions. In September 2016, Triple Five announced that the indoor amusement park space would be occupied by Nickelodeon Universe, and that DreamWorks Animation would work in partnership to develop the water park.

Triple Five stated in June 2018 that the water park would open in the end of 2019. By November 2018, the mall's vice president of Communications announced that the water park would open in September 2019. However, by that date, DreamWorks Water Park's opening had been delayed to November 27, 2019. In October 2019, surfers began testing the  wave pool. Six days before the scheduled opening, Triple Five announced that they were postponing the water park opening again due to undisclosed reasons. On February 25, 2020, the New Jersey Department of Community Affairs announced that 18 of the 27 rides at the park had been inspected and approved for opening. Of the other nine, four had completed engineering review and were ready for inspection, and the last five rides were still in engineering review.

On February 27, 2020, DreamWorks Water Park announced an opening date of March 19, 2020. However, due to the onset of the COVID-19 pandemic in New Jersey, its opening was delayed once again. On September 3, 2020, American Dream announced the new opening date for the water park. DreamWorks Water Park officially opened on October 1, 2020.

Incidents
DreamWorks Water Park was temporarily closed on February 19, 2023, after a decorative helicopter fell into a swimming pool, injuring four people. The park later reopened six days later on February 25, 2023, with the helicopter permanently removed.

Attractions 
DreamWorks Water Park occupies six stories adjacent to Nickelodeon Universe American Dream. Specific areas include an area themed around Shrek's Soggy Swamp, a Kung Fu Panda-themed children's play area called the Kung Fu Panda Zone, and a Madagascar-themed tower called Madagascar Rain Forest with 15 water slides. All of the park's water slides were exclusively developed by ProSlide Technology, a Canadian company. Another attraction is a  "hydro-magnetic roller coaster called Toothless Trickling Torpedo" and a Proslide KrakenRACER  mat racer slide called Dragon Racers. Dragon Racers and Toothless Trickeling Torpedo are the only rides in the water park that are themed towards the How to Train Your Dragon franchise.

There are also 31 luxury cabanas within DreamWorks Water Park. These were built to plans by interior designer Jonathan Adler, a native New Jerseyan. Themed decorations include balloons of Shrek and Donkey from the Shrek movie franchise, and Alex and Marty from the Madagascar movie franchise. Characters such as Shrek, Puss In Boots, Alex the Lion, King Julien, the Penguins of Madagascar, Po, and Poppy and Branch from Trolls, make daily appearances at the water park.

List of attractions
 Mad Flush
 Bubbly Lazy River
 Far Far A Bay Wavepool
 Forbidden Waters Hot Tubs
 King Julien's Pineapple Jam Swim-Up Bar
 Kung Fu Panda Temple Of Awesomeness Play Structure
 Soakin' Surfari
 The Penguins Frozen Fun Zone
 Dragon And Dronkey's Flight
 Dragon Racers
 Lemur Leap
 Speeding Frenzy (Turbo)
 Swamp N' Splash
 Tube It!
 Penguins Plummet
 Majunga Jump
 Shrek's Sinkhole Slammer
 Zany Zigzag
 Zanier Zigzag
 Toothless Trickling Torpedo
 Thrillagascar
 Jungle Jammer
 Surfari Slider
 The Carnivortex

Notes

References

External links

 www.AmericanDream.com/make-a-splash

DreamWorks Animation
East Rutherford, New Jersey
Meadowlands Sports Complex
Operating amusement attractions
Tourist attractions in Bergen County, New Jersey
Water parks in New Jersey